Chinese Air Force may refer to:

People's Republic of China (PRC) Air Force
 People's Liberation Army Air Force: the air force of the People's Republic of China
 People's Liberation Army Naval Air Force: the air component of the navy
 People's Liberation Army Ground Air Force: the air component of the ground force
Republic of China (ROC) Air Force:
Republic of China Air Force: the air force of the Republic of China established on the mainland in 1920, operating in the Taiwan Area since 1949 after its retreat
Republic of China Navy air component: Republic of China Naval Aviation Command
Republic of China Army air component
China Air Task Force: An interim unit formed mainly from the Flying Tigers after their disbandment on July 4, 1942 and before their reunion, in part, within the 14th Air Force in 1943.